Wierzbicki (feminine: Wierzbicka, plural: Wierzbiccy) is a noble Polish family name. It derives form the Polish word wierzba, meaning willow and as a toponym of the village of Wierzbica. The Lithuanian form is Verbickas and the Russian is Verbitsky/Verbitski.

People
 Alicia Fulford-Wierzbicki (born ?), New Zealand actress
 Anna Wierzbicka (born 1938), Polish-Australian linguist
 Felix Wierzbicki (1815–1860), Polish-American physician, traveler, and author
 Stanisław Wierzbicki (born 1959), Polish rower

See also
 
 
 Wólka Wierzbicka, a settlement in southeastern Poland

Polish-language surnames